Emueje Ogbiagbevha is a Nigerian football striker currently playing for FC Minsk in the Belarusian Premier League. She previously played for BIIK Kazygurt in the Kazakhstani Championship, and in the Russian Championship for Rossiyanka and Energiya Voronezh. She was the top scorer of the 2010 season while playing in Rossiyanka, with which she won two doubles. She has also played the Champions League with Energiya Voronezh and Kazygurt, and she is a member of the Nigerian national team. Her contract with BIIK Kazygurt finishes in the end of 2012.
In 2016, Ogbiagbevha joined FC Minsk.

In the 2019-20 season she became the first African woman to win the (shared) UEFA Women's Champions League topscorer award. After the season her contract expired at Minsk.

Early career 
She previously played for Pelican Stars F.C., Nasarawa Amazons and Delta Queens F.C. in the Nigeria Women Premier League.

References

1990 births
Living people
Nigerian women's footballers
Expatriate women's footballers in Russia
Expatriate women's footballers in Kazakhstan
Expatriate women's footballers in Belarus
WFC Rossiyanka players
FC Energy Voronezh players
FC Minsk (women) players
Nigeria women's international footballers
Women's association football forwards
BIIK Kazygurt players